Uno "Miff" Görling (March 21, 1909, Stockholm – February 24, 1988, Stockholm) was a Swedish jazz bandleader, trombonist, arranger, and composer. His brother was Zilas Görling.

Görling, who took his nickname from trombonist Miff Mole, got his start late in the 1920s with Frank Vernon's orchestra, where he played until 1932. He then worked with Arne Hülphers, Gösta Jonsson, Seymour Österwall, and Gösta Säfbom before organizing his own ensemble in 1938. He led bands into the 1950s, and also did arrangement and composition work for other jazz groups as well as for popular Swedish musicians.

References

Swedish jazz trombonists
Swedish jazz bandleaders
Swedish composers
Swedish male composers
Swedish conductors (music)
Male conductors (music)
1909 births
1988 deaths
20th-century trombonists
20th-century Swedish male musicians
20th-century Swedish musicians
Male jazz musicians